Sir Guy Douglas Arthur Fleetwood Wilson  (also Fleetwood-Wilson; 21 October 1850 – 24 December 1940) was a British public servant. A finance specialist, he spent the bulk of his career in the War Office, before serving as Finance Member of the Viceroy's Council in India.

Fleetwood Wilson was born and raised in Florence, Italy, where he was known as Guido, a name that stuck with him throughout his life. He was the son of Captain Thomas Hugh Fleetwood Wilson of the 8th Hussars, who served as Lieutenant-Governor of Barbados, and Harriet Horatia Walker, daughter of Capt. Charles Montagu Walker of the Royal Naval. He joined the Home Civil Service as a clerk in the Postmaster General's Department in 1870, then became private secretary to Sir Charles Wilson in Egypt in 1876. Transferring to the War Office in 1883, he was private secretary to several Secretaries of State, and became the first director-general of army finance in 1904. In 1907, he went to India as finance member of the council of the governor-general of India.

He was knighted in 1902, sworn in as a Privy Counsellor in 1914, and was appointed a Knight Commander of the Order of the Bath in 1905, Knight Commander of the Order of St Michael and St George 1908, and a Knight Grand Commander of the Order of the Indian Empire in 1911.

In 1922, he published a memoir of his correspondence, Letters to Somebody: A Retrospect.

He was a devoted reader of The Times, and wrote to the newspaper in 1932:

He died in Stratford-upon-Avon, aged 90.

References

External links

1850 births
1940 deaths
Knights Bachelor
Knights Commander of the Order of the Bath
Knights Commander of the Order of St Michael and St George
Knights Grand Commander of the Order of the Indian Empire
Members of the Privy Council of the United Kingdom
People from Florence
Members of the Council of the Governor General of India
Civil servants in the War Office